The Central American and Caribbean Age Group Championships in Athletics was hosted for the first time in Tortola, British Virgin Islands, on July 1–2, 2011.  The BVI Athletics Association is organizing the event which is part of its 40th anniversary activities.  It is
the smallest CACAC family member to host a CACAC Championships event, which is held for the first time in the Leeward Islands.

15 new championships records were established, and the athletes from Barbados collected the most points to win the overall trophy in the CAC age group championships for the third time in the role.

Participation

A total of 139 athletes from 20 CACAC member federations participated in the event. The competition results are published.  Each participating federation earned at least one medal.

Medal summary

Medal table (unofficial)

Team trophies

References

External links
Official CACAC Website

Central American and Caribbean Age Group Championships in Athletics
Ath
2011 in British Virgin Islands sport
Central American and Caribbean Age Group
Athletic
Athletic
Athletics in the British Virgin Islands
2011 in youth sport